Michael Jamie Clegg (born 3 July 1977) is an English football coach and former player who played as a defender. He is currently the manager of Warrington Rylands.

He began his professional playing career with Manchester United in the mid-1990s. He made 24 appearances for the club between 1996 and 2001, and spent time on loan to Ipswich Town and Wigan Athletic before making a permanent move to Oldham Athletic in 2002. He made 52 appearances in two seasons with the Latics before struggles with his mental health led to his retirement at the age of 26.

Playing career
Clegg, born in Ashton-under-Lyne, began his football career as a trainee with Manchester United and was part of the 1995 FA Youth Cup-winning side. He turned professional soon afterwards, and made his first-team debut on 23 November 1996, in a Premier League game away to Middlesbrough which finished as a 2–2 draw. He played in four FA Premier League games in the 1996–97 season, and although United were champions for the fourth time in five seasons it was not enough for a title winner's medal. He managed a further three appearances in 1997–98 (when United were trophyless for only the second time in the decade) before making his final two appearances in the 1999–2000 campaign, when United won their sixth title in eight seasons, but once again Clegg failed to meet the required number of appearances for a title winner's medal.

Clegg spent time on loan at Ipswich Town and Wigan Athletic before he joined Second Division club Oldham Athletic on a free transfer on 19 February 2002. In his first season, he played just 10 times as Oldham qualified for the Second Division play-offs, only to see them beaten in the semi-finals. A potential purchase of the club fell through and they went into administration, resulting in the squad being gutted to cover their debts. Clegg remained with the club and played 32 times as they finished in 15th place; however, he struggled with his mental health and retired from professional football at the end of the 2003–04 season.

Coaching career
After two years out of the game, Clegg was appointed by former Manchester United team-mate Roy Keane as Sunderland's strength and conditioning coach in 2006.

On 6 July 2019, Clegg was announced as a first-team strength and power coach at Manchester United.

On 14 February 2023, Clegg was appointed manager of Northern Premier League Premier Division club Warrington Rylands.

Personal life
Clegg's father, Mike, was strength and conditioning coach at Manchester United from 2000 to 2011. Clegg's cousin, David, committed suicide at the age of 19.

Honours
Individual
Denzil Haroun Reserve Team Player of the Year: 1996–97

References

External links

England profile at The Football Association

1977 births
Living people
Footballers from Ashton-under-Lyne
English footballers
Association football defenders
Manchester United F.C. players
Ipswich Town F.C. players
Wigan Athletic F.C. players
Oldham Athletic A.F.C. players
Premier League players
English Football League players
Sunderland A.F.C. non-playing staff
Manchester United F.C. non-playing staff
Warrington Rylands 1906 F.C. managers
Northern Premier League managers